Urban Explorers: Into the Darkness is a documentary film about urban exploration directed by Melody Gilbert.

Soundtrack artists
 Big Fuckin Skull
 Big Quarters
 Cave Man
 Terry Eason
 The Hopefuls
 Kid Dakota
 Mark Mallman
 John Munson
 The Owls
 P.O.S
 David Salmela

References

External links
 
 

2007 films
2007 documentary films
Documentary films about cities
American documentary films
Films about urban exploration
2000s English-language films
2000s American films